Myssjö-Ovikens IF is a Swedish football club located in Oviken.

Background
The football club was formed following the merger of the Myssjö IF and Ovikens IF clubs in 1970.  Both clubs appeared regularly in Division 4 Jämtland in the 1960s and Myssjö IF played one season in Division 3 in 1968.

Myssjö-Ovikens IF currently plays in Division 4 Jämtland/Härjedalen which is the sixth tier of Swedish football. They play their home matches at the Åsvallen in Oviken.

The club is affiliated to Jämtland-Härjedalens Fotbollförbund.

Season to season

In their most successful period Myssjö IF competed in the following divisions:

In their most successful period Ovikens IF competed in the following divisions:

The new club Myssjö-Ovikens IF were relegated in 1972 to Division 5:

In recent seasons Myssjö-Ovikens IF have competed in the following divisions:

Footnotes

External links
 Myssjö-Ovikens IF – Official website

Football clubs in Jämtland County
1970 establishments in Sweden